ITA Award for Best Director - Drama is an award given by Indian Television Academy as a part of its annual event.

Winners

References 

Awards established in 2001
Indian Television Academy Awards